Colfax Township is one of ten townships in Newton County, Indiana, United States. As of the 2010 census, its population was 199 and it contained 70 housing units.

History
Colfax Township was established in 1871. It was named for Vice President Schuyler Colfax.

Geography

School districts
 North Newton School Corporation

Political districts
 Indiana's 1st congressional district
 State House District 15
 State Senate District 6

References
 
 United States Census Bureau 2008 TIGER/Line Shapefiles
 IndianaMap

External links
 Indiana Township Association
 United Township Association of Indiana
 City-Data.com page for Colfax Township

Townships in Newton County, Indiana
Townships in Indiana